KJKS (99.9 FM) is a radio station broadcasting a hot adult contemporary format. Licensed to serve Kahului, Hawaii, United States, the station is currently owned by Pacific Radio Group, Inc.

History
The station went on the air as KHUI on 1984-02-01. On 1990-03-09, the station changed its call sign to KNUI-FM and, on 2005-02-01, to the current KJKS.

References

External links

JKS
Radio stations established in 1984